George Thomas Robertson (11 May 1927 — 9 January 2021) was a Canadian professional ice hockey forward who played 31 games in the National Hockey League between 1948 and 1949 for the Montreal Canadiens. The rest of his career, which lasted from 1947 to 1956, was spent in various minor leagues.

He died from COVID-19 in Winnipeg on January 9, 2021, during the COVID-19 pandemic in Manitoba.

Awards and achievements
Memorial Cup Championship (1946)
MMHL Second All-Star Team (1954)

Career statistics

Regular season and playoffs

References

External links
 

1927 births
2021 deaths
Canadian expatriate ice hockey players in the United States
Canadian ice hockey forwards
Deaths from the COVID-19 pandemic in Canada
Cincinnati Mohawks (AHL) players
Grand Rapids Rockets players
Montreal Canadiens players
Saskatoon Quakers players
Ice hockey people from Winnipeg
Springfield Indians players
Vancouver Canucks (WHL) players
Winnipeg Monarchs players